Cruz del Sur is an Argentine football club located in the city of Bariloche of Río Negro Province. The squad currently plays in Torneo Argentino B, the fourth division of the Argentine football league system.

External links
Cruz del Sur Website 
Cruzado Pasión 

Football clubs in Río Negro Province
Association football clubs established in 1988
1988 establishments in Argentina
Bariloche